Expand Your Head is a compilation album from Belgian electronic dance music band Lords of Acid.  Consisting mostly of remixes, three of the album's sixteen tracks were new compositions.  Several of the remixes included on Expand Your Head had been previously released on Lords of Acid singles.

Track listing 
"Am I Sexy?" (Praga Khan, Jade 4 U, Carl Johansen, Oliver Adams)
"Lover" (Cake Mix, remixer: KMFDM)
"Rough Sex" (The All Night Grinder Mix, remixer: Critter)
"The Crablouse" (Super Scratcher with a Golden Shower Rainbow Mix, remixer: Luc van Acker)
"As I Am" (Praga Khan, Jade 4 U, Carl Johansen)
"Who Do You Think You Are?" (Praga Khan, Jade 4 U, Carl Johansen)
"I Sit on Acid" (Mickey Blotter Mix, remixer: Carl Johansen)
"Pussy" (Pussymphony II Mix, remixer: Chris Vrenna)
"Let's Get High" (Reach Out and Touch the Sky Mix, remixer: Rob Swift)
"Spank My Booty" (Paddles and Whipped Cream Mix, remixer: Tipsy)
"Rubber Doll" (Pucker Up Sweetie and Blow Me Up Gently Mix, remixer: Jamie Myerson)
"Marijuana in Your Brain" (Dope Smokin' Mix, remixer: Robbie Hardkiss)
"Rough Sex" (Whip Mix, remixer: Joey Beltram)
"I Sit on Acid" (Satan on the Cibes Mix, remixer: God Lives Underwater)
"Rubber Doll" (Do You Mind If We Dance Wif Yo Dates? Mix, remixer: Frankie Bones)
"I Must Increase My Bust" (Detroit Hardcore Mix, remixer: Richie Hawtin)
"Lady Marmalade" (unlisted bonus track)

References

Lords of Acid albums
1999 remix albums